Cătălin Moroșan (30 June 1984) is a retired Romanian kickboxer, chanbara practitioner and professional rugby player. He is best known for his time in the Superkombat Fighting Championship (SUPERKOMBAT), where he competed in the heavyweight division. Moroșanu also competed for Local Kombat, K-1, Glory and Dynamite Fighting Show. He is currently a politician and kickboxing promoter, serving as president of the Dynamite Fighting Show.

He is the winner of season 9 of Romanian Dancing with the Stars and winner of I'm a Celebrity...Get Me Out of Here! Season 1.

Moroșanu still holds the record for longest winning streak in SUPERKOMBAT history with 17 consecutive wins. His streak, started in 2011, came to an end in controversial loss to Daniel Sam at SUPERKOMBAT World Grand Prix: Puerto Rico in 2016.

He held notable victories in his career over Stefan Leko, Gary Goodridge, Mighty Mo, Carter Williams, Paul Slowinski, Freddy Kemayo and Anderson Silva.

Moroșanu was considered to be slugger (brawler). He was a fighter who had the power to knock out their opponents with one punch. He compared himself to Bob Sapp.

As of 1 November 2018, he is #10 contender in the world in official GLORY heavyweight rankings. And as of 6 June 2019, he is ranked the #12 heavyweight in the world by All The Best Fights.

In 2017, Disney Pixar chose the kickboxer to provide the Romanian voice of a local from the animated movie Coco.

Career

2005–2007
After a short career as a professional rugby player, Moroșanu began kickboxing professionally in 2005 and spent the majority of his early career competing in the Local Kombat promotion in his home country.

He made his K-1 debut on April 5, 2007 at K-1 Fighting Network Romania 2007 against Stefan Leko., and was handed the first defeat of his career by the German veteran as he lost via unanimous decision. Following this, he returned to Local Kombat to take three more wins, over Dimitry Podgaisky, Sergei Gur and Nicolas Vermont, by the end of the year.

2008
In 2008, Moroșanu was invited to take part in the K-1 European Grand Prix. The opening round was held at the K-1 World Grand Prix 2008 in Budapest Europe GP Final Elimination on February 9 where he was able to defeat Turkish fighter Erhan Deniz via unanimous decision after an extra round. In the quarter-finals at the K-1 World Grand Prix 2008 in Amsterdam on April 26, Moroșanu was knocked out with a knee strike by Frenchman Freddy Kemayo just seconds into the opening round.

Following a first-round knock out of Junichi Sawayashiki at the K-1 World Grand Prix 2008 in Taipei on July 13, Moroșanu rematched Kemayo on November 6 at Local Kombat 31 in Buzău, Romania. He was able to avenge his defeat by winning the match by unanimous decision.

He ended the year by defeating Trinidadian brawler Gary Goodridge in a match for the WKN Intercontinental Heavyweight Championship at Local Kombat 32 on December 12. After being dominated for most of the fight, Goodridge quit on his stool at the end of the second round.

2009
Moroșanu began 2009 with a fifty-eight-second knockout of Musab Gulsari at the K-1 Rules Tournament 2009 in Budapest on February 28. In his next match on 16 May at K-1 ColliZion 2009 Mlada Boleslav, he lost by another knee KO in an upset loss to Slovakian Tomas Kohut. He bounced back, however, by knocking out Wiesław Kwaśniewski in round one at K-1 ColliZion 2009 Sarajevo.

His KO wins then earned him a chance to compete in a superfight at the K-1 World Grand Prix 2009 in Seoul Final 16 on September 26, where he faced Japanese karate fighter Taiei Kin in a highly-controversial bout. Towards the end of the first round, the "clapper" (the device used to signal the remaining 10 seconds of the round) sounded. Moroșanu seemed to think the sound indicative of the ending of the round, and began walking towards his corner, only to be met by a punch from Kin (who was rightfully continuing in the context of the official rules regarding the fight). The end bell, signifying the officially sanctioned end of the round, sounded moments later.  Moroșanu deliberately continued to fight, hitting Taiei (who was defenseless after dropping his hands at the end of the round) with a two punch flurry, knocking him unconscious. Moroșanu was disqualified from the fight, thus giving the victory to Taiei by means of disqualification.

The audience present at the show booed the decision awarding Taiei the victory. The crowd believed the punches to have been thrown before or exactly when the bell had sounded. However, video evidence refutes this.

He rebounded by beating Samoan-American slugger Mighty Mo in a close match at K-1 ColliZion 2009 Final Elimination on October 24. The bout was ruled a draw after three rounds, so an extra round was permitted to decide a winner, after which Moroșanu was ruled the victor by split decision.

2010
On February 6, Moroșanu defeated Deutsch Pu'u via technical knockout in the first round at the K-1 ColliZion MAX 2010 Europe GP in Budapest, Hungary. In his next bout, he faced Errol Zimmerman at the K-1 World Grand Prix 2010 in Bucharest on 21 May and lost via TKO in round one. Just twenty seconds into the round, Zimmerman rocked Moroșanu with a flying knee and right hook which forced the referee to stop the fight.

Following this, he picked up a unanimous decision win over Igor Mihaljević at a show in Sarajevo, Bosnia and Herzegovina on October 29. On November 27, he rematched Gary Goodridge at K-1 Scandinavia Rumble of the Kings 2010 in Stockholm, Sweden and was able to better "Big Daddy" once again as he won via TKO (referee stoppage) in the second round.

2011
In 2011, Moroșanu began competing regularly for the newly founded SuperKombat promotion. On March 18 at SuperKombat: The Pilot Show in Râmnicu Vâlcea, Romania, he took a unanimous decision victory over Yüksel Ayadin.

On June 16 at the SuperKombat World Grand Prix II 2011 in Constanța, Romania, he took revenge over Stefan Leko, the man who handed him his first career loss, winning by unanimous decision.

In October, he took another two decision victories in the space of two weeks by defeating Michael Andrade and Ibrahim Aarab at the SuperKombat World Grand Prix III 2011 and SuperKombat World Grand Prix IV 2011, respectively.

He was then expected to face Melvin Manhoef at the SuperKombat World Grand Prix Final 2011 on November 19, 2011 in Darmstadt, Germany. However, he fought Patrick Liedert instead. Moroșanu's reckless start to the fight allowed Liedert to knock him down twice early in the first round, but he was still able to make a comeback and KO'd the German on the bell at the end of round 1.

2012
On February 25, 2012, Moroșanu won the SuperKombat World Grand Prix I 2012, showing an improved kicking game and technical boxing skills. In the semi-finals, he knocked out Utley Meriana with a high kick in the second round, and in the final, he took a clear-cut unanimous decision win over Anderson "Braddock" Silva. The tournament win qualified him for the SuperKombat World Grand Prix Final 2012.

He faced Paul Slowinski at the K-1 World Grand Prix 2012 in Tokyo Final 16 on October 14, 2012. He won via unanimous decision after sending the Pole to the canvas twice in round three.

He beat Carter Williams by unanimous decision on November 10, 2012 in Craiova, Romania in a non-tournament at the SuperKombat World Grand Prix 2012 Final Elimination.

2013
At the K-1 World Grand Prix 2012 Final on March 15, 2013 in Zagreb, Croatia, he faced Pavel Zhuravlev in the quarter-finals and lost by unanimous decision, bringing an end to his twelve-fight winning streak.

He TKO'd Eduardo Mendes in round one at SuperKombat World Grand Prix 10 in Craiova, Romania on May 18, 2013.

He challenged Ben Edwards for the vacant Kings of Kombat Heavyweight Championship at Kings of Kombat 10 in Melbourne, Australia on September 7, 2013, losing by majority decision in a fight where Moroșanu relied on his typical brawling style while Edwards utilized low kicks heavily throughout.

He scored a brutal first-round KO over Daniel Lentie the SuperKombat World Grand Prix 2013 Final Elimination in Ploiești, Romania on November 9, 2013.

2014
He defeated Mohamed Karim via unanimous decision at the SUPERKOMBAT World Grand Prix I 2014 in Reșița, Romania on April 12, 2014.

2015

In 2015 Cătălin Moroșanu won "Sunt Celebru Scoate-ma De Aici"

2019

Moroșanu vs. Ghiță
Cătălin Moroșanu and Daniel Ghiță will fight at Arena Națională in Bucharest, in a suggested Dynamite Fighting Show / Colosseum Tournament mixed event or in a neutral (Romanian) promotion event.

Outside the ring

Personal life
Moroșanu is married and has one daughter. He holds a bachelor's degree in Law and also owns a kickboxing gym in his home country of Romania. A notably interesting fact about Moroșanu is that the K-1 promotion arbitrarily created the image of him as a crop farmer. In one of their promotional video-clips, Moroșanu appears driving an old tractor.
In yet another clip from the company, Moroșanu appears to be drinking and promoting a brand of wine, which supposedly gives him super-hero like fighting powers. The wine is supposed to be, albeit fallaciously, his own signature line.

Television
From March 19 through May 7, 2010, Moroșanu participated in Dansez pentru tine (the local version of Dancing with the Stars). He stated that his motivation and financial winnings would go to support a young widow, who wanted to make her daughter's life easier, and filled with the happiness that she deserved but had lost with the death of her father. He made it to the final elimination round, and won the 1st place at the end of the show, earning 60,000 Euros for Magdalena Ciorobea (his dancing partner in the show), collecting over 13,000 votes.

On March 8, 2015 Moroșanu won the first series of Sunt celebru, scoate-mă de aici!, the Romanian version of I'm a Celebrity...Get Me Out of Here!.

Politics
Moroșanu is currently serving a term as a Iași County councilor. He has been elected in June 2012.

Championships and accomplishments

Kickboxing
Dynamite Fighting Show 
Fight of the Night (One time) vs. Daniel Sam
SUPERKOMBAT Fighting Championship
SUPERKOMBAT World Grand Prix I 2012 Heavyweight Tournament Championship 
Longest win streak in SUPERKOMBAT history (17)
Most wins in SUPERKOMBAT heavyweight division history (18)
2014 Most Popular Fighter
2011 Most Popular Fighter 
Local Kombat
2010 Most Popular Fighter
K-1
2012 K-1 World Grand Prix Finalist
 Fight of the Night (one time) 
World Kickboxing Network
2008 WKN Intercontinental Heavyweight Championship (One time)

Chanbara
Romanian Chanbara Federation 
2021 Romania Beach Chanbara Senior National Championship Choken Free Gold Medalist

Kickboxing record

|- 
|
|Win
| Daniel Sam
|Dynamite Fighting Show 4
|Cluj-Napoca, Romania
|Decision (unanimous)
|style="text-align:center;"|3
|style="text-align:center;"|3:00
|   
|- 
|
|Win
| Ivo Ćuk
|Dynamite Fighting Show 3
|Craiova, Romania
|KO (punches)
|style="text-align:center;"|1
|style="text-align:center;"|0:31
|  
|- 
|
|Win
| Mehmet Özer
|Dynamite Fighting Show 2
|Piatra Neamț, Romania
|TKO
|style="text-align:center;"|1
|style="text-align:center;"|2:50
|  
|- 
|
|Win
| Freddy Kemayo
|Dynamite Fighting Show 1
|Bucharest, Romania
|Decision (unanimous)
|style="text-align:center;"|3
|style="text-align:center;"|3:00
|   
|- 
|
|Loss
| Michał Turyński
|Glory 44: Chicago
|Hoffman Estates, Illinois, USA
|Decision (split)
|style="text-align:center;"|3
|style="text-align:center;"|3:00
|   
|- 
|
|Win
| Lukasz Krupadziorow 
|SUPERKOMBAT World Grand Prix II 2017
|Madrid, Spain
|Decision (unanimous)
| style="text-align:center;"|3
| style="text-align:center;"|3:00
| 
|- 
|
|Win
| Maurice Greene 
|Glory 38: Chicago
|Hoffman Estates, Illinois, USA
|TKO (referee stoppage/left hook)
| style="text-align:center;"|2
| style="text-align:center;"|0:23
| 
|- 
|
|Loss
| Ondřej Hutník 
|W5 Grand Prix "Legends in Prague"
|Prague, The Czech Republic
|Unanimous (decision)
| style="text-align:center;"|3
| style="text-align:center;"|3:00
| 
|- 
|
|Loss
| Zabit Samedov 
|Akhmat Fight Show
|Grozny, Russia
|KO (right knee)
| style="text-align:center;"|1
| style="text-align:center;"|1:13 
| For the WBC Muaythai World Heavywheight Championship −104.50 kg.
|- 
|
|Loss
| Daniel Sam
|SUPERKOMBAT World Grand Prix I 2016 
|San Juan, Puerto Rico
|Decision (split)
| style="text-align:center;"|3
| style="text-align:center;"|3:00 
| 
|-
|
|Win
| Maurice Jackson
|SUPERKOMBAT Special Edition Italy 
|Turin, Italy
|DQ
| style="text-align:center;"|1
|
|  
|-
|
|Win
| Tomasz Czerwiński 
|SUPERKOMBAT World Grand Prix 2015 Final Elimination
|Milan, Italy
|KO (left hook)
| style="text-align:center;"|1
| style="text-align:center;"|2:55
|
|-
|
|Win
| Colin George
|SUPERKOMBAT World Grand Prix III 2015
|Constanța, Romania
|Decision (unanimous)
| style="text-align:center;"|3
| style="text-align:center;"|3:00 
|
|-
|
|Win
| Brian Douwes
|SUPERKOMBAT World Grand Prix IV 2014
|Almere, Netherlands
|Decision (unanimous)
| style="text-align:center;"|3
| style="text-align:center;"|3:00
|
|-
|
|Win
| Giannis Stoforidis
|SUPERKOMBAT New Heroes 8
|Constanța, Romania
|KO (left hook)
| style="text-align:center;"|2
| style="text-align:center;"|2:26
| 
|-
|
| Loss
| Tomáš Hron
|Gibu Fight Night 
|Prague, Czech Republic
|Decision (unanimous)
| style="text-align:center;"|3
| style="text-align:center;"|3:00
| 
|-
|
|Win
| Mohamed Karim
|SUPERKOMBAT World Grand Prix I 2014
|Reșița, Romania
|Decision (unnaimous)
| style="text-align:center;"|3
| style="text-align:center;"|3:00
| 
|-
|
|Win
| Daniel Lentie
|SuperKombat World Grand Prix 2013 Final Elimination
|Ploiești, Romania
|KO (right hook)
| style="text-align:center;"|1
| style="text-align:center;"|2:20
| 
|-
|
|Loss
| Ben Edwards
|Kings of Kombat 10
|Melbourne
|Decision (majority)
| style="text-align:center;"|3
| style="text-align:center;"|3:00
| For Kings of Kombat Heavyweight title.
|-
|-
|
|Win
| Eduardo Mendes
|SuperKombat World Grand Prix II 2013
|Craiova, Romania
|TKO (referee stoppage)
| style="text-align:center;"|1
| style="text-align:center;"|2:54
| 
|-
|
|Loss
| Pavel Zhuravlev
|K-1 World Grand Prix 2012 Final
|Zagreb, Croatia
|Decision (unanimous)
| style="text-align:center;"|3
| style="text-align:center;"|3:00
|K-1 World Grand Prix 2012 Final quarter-finals.
|-
|
|Win
| Carter Williams
|SuperKombat World Grand Prix Final Elimination 2012
|Craiova, Romania
|Decision (unanimous)
| style="text-align:center;"|3
| style="text-align:center;"|3:00
|
|-
|
|Win
| Paul Slowinski
|K-1 World Grand Prix 2012 in Tokyo Final 16
|Tokyo, Japan
|Decision (unanimous)
| style="text-align:center;"|3
| style="text-align:center;"|3:00
|Qualifies for the K-1 World Grand Prix 2012 Final.
|-
|
|Win
| Rick Cheek
|SuperKombat World Grand Prix III 2012
|Varna, Bulgaria
|TKO 
| style="text-align:center;"|2
| style="text-align:center;"|1:53
|
|-
|
|Win
| Anderson Silva
|SuperKombat World Grand Prix I 2012
|Podgorica, Montenegro
|Decision (unanimous)
| style="text-align:center;"|3
| style="text-align:center;"|3:00
|SuperKombat World Grand Prix I 2012 final.
|-
|
|Win
| Utley Meriana
|SuperKombat World Grand Prix I 2012
|Podgorica, Montenegro
|KO (left high kick)
| style="text-align:center;"|2
| style="text-align:center;"|0:56
|SuperKombat World Grand Prix I 2012 semi-finals.
|-
|
|Win
| Patrick Liedert
|SuperKombat World Grand Prix Final 2011
|Darmstadt, Germany
|KO (punches)
| style="text-align:center;"|1
| style="text-align:center;"|2:59
|
|-
|
|Win
| Ibrahim Aarab
|SuperKombat World Grand Prix IV 2011
|Piatra Neamț, Romania
|Decision (unanimous)
| style="text-align:center;"|3
| style="text-align:center;"|3:00
|
|-
|
|Win
| Michael Andrade
|SuperKombat World Grand Prix III 2011
|Brăila, Romania
|Decision (unanimous)
| style="text-align:center;"|3
| style="text-align:center;"|3:00
|
|-
|
|Win
| Stefan Leko
|SuperKombat World Grand Prix II 2011
|Constanța, Romania
|Decision (unanimous)
| style="text-align:center;"|3
| style="text-align:center;"|3:00
|
|-
|
|Win
| Yüksel Ayaydın
|SuperKombat: The Pilot Show
|Râmnicu Vâlcea, Romania
|Decision (unanimous)
| style="text-align:center;"|3
| style="text-align:center;"|3:00
|
|-
|
|Win
| Gary Goodridge
|K-1 Scandinavia Rumble of the Kings 2010
|Stockholm, Sweden
|TKO (referee stoppage)
| style="text-align:center;"|2
| style="text-align:center;"|2:24
|
|-
|
|Win
| Igor Mihaljević
|Sarajevo Fight Night II
|Sarajevo, Bosnia and Herzegovina
|Decision (unanimous)
| style="text-align:center;"|3
| style="text-align:center;"|3:00
|
|-
|
|Loss
| Errol Zimmerman
|K-1 World Grand Prix 2010 in Bucharest
|Bucharest, Romania
|TKO (referee stoppage)
| style="text-align:center;"|1
| style="text-align:center;"|0:24
|
|-
|
|Win
| Deutsch Pu'u
|K-1 ColliZion MAX 2010 Europe GP
|Budapest, Hungary
|TKO (referee stoppage)
| style="text-align:center;"|1
| style="text-align:center;"|-
|
|-
|
|Win
| Mighty Mo
|K-1 ColliZion 2009 Final Elimination
|Arad, Romania
|Extra round decision (split)
| style="text-align:center;"|4
| style="text-align:center;"|3:00
|
|-
|
|Loss
| Taiei Kin
|K-1 World Grand Prix 2009 in Seoul Final 16
|Seoul, South Korea
|DQ (Kin KO'd after the bell)
| style="text-align:center;"|1
| style="text-align:center;"|3:00
|
|-
|
|Win
| Wiesław Kwaśniewski
|K-1 ColliZion 2009 Sarajevo
|Sarajevo, Bosnia and Herzegovina
|KO (liver punch)
| style="text-align:center;"|1
| style="text-align:center;"|1:20
|
|-
|
|Loss
| Tomas Kohut
|K-1 ColliZion 2009 Mlada Boleslav
|Mlada Boleslav, Czech Republic
|KO (knee)
| style="text-align:center;"|3
| style="text-align:center;"|-
|
|-
|
|Win
| Musap Gulsari
|K-1 Rules Tournament 2009 in Budapest
|Budapest, Hungary
|KO (left hook)
| style="text-align:center;"|1
| style="text-align:center;"|0:58
|
|-
|
|Win
| Gary Goodridge
|Local Kombat 32
|Ploiești, Romania
|TKO (corner stoppage)
| style="text-align:center;"|2
| style="text-align:center;"|3:00
|Wins WKN Intercontinental Heavyweight Championship.
|-
|
|Win
| Freddy Kemayo
|Local Kombat 31
|Buzău, Romania
|Decision (unanimous)
| style="text-align:center;"|3
| style="text-align:center;"|3:00
|
|-
|
|Win
| Junichi Sawayashiki
|K-1 World Grand Prix 2008 in Taipei
|Taipei, Taiwan
|KO (left hook)
| style="text-align:center;"|1
| style="text-align:center;"|2:04
|
|-
|
|Loss
| Freddy Kemayo
|K-1 World Grand Prix 2008 in Amsterdam
|Amsterdam, Netherlands
|KO (knee)
| style="text-align:center;"|1
| style="text-align:center;"|0:35
|2008 European Grand Prix quarter-final.
|-
|
|Win
| Erhan Deniz
|K-1 World Grand Prix 2008 in Budapest Europe GP Final Elimination
|Budapest, Hungary
|Extra round decision (unanimous)
| style="text-align:center;"|4
| style="text-align:center;"|3:00
|2008 European Grand Prix opening round.
|-
|
|Win
| Nicolas Vermont
|Local Kombat 28
|Brașov, Romania
|TKO
| style="text-align:center;"|3
| style="text-align:center;"|-
|
|-
|
|Win
| Sergei Gur
|Local Kombat 27 
|Drobeta-Turnu Severin, Romania
|Decision
| style="text-align:center;"|3
| style="text-align:center;"|3:00
|
|-
|
|Win
| Dimitry Podgaisky
|Local Kombat 26
|Iași, Romania
|TKO
| style="text-align:center;"|2
| style="text-align:center;"|-
|
|-
|
|Loss
| Stefan Leko
|K-1 Fighting Network Romania 2007
|Bucharest, Romania
|Decision (unanimous)
| style="text-align:center;"|3
| style="text-align:center;"|3:00
|
|-
|
|Win
| Omar Bellamar
| Local Kombat 25
|Sibiu, Romania
|TKO
| style="text-align:center;"|2
| style="text-align:center;"|-
|
|-
|
|Win
| Panayiotis Diakos
|Local Kombat 24
|Bucharest, Romania
|KO
| style="text-align:center;"|2
| style="text-align:center;"|-
|
|-
|
|Win
| Mihăiţă Golescu
|Local Kombat 23
|Râmnicu Vâlcea, Romania
|Extra round decision
| style="text-align:center;"|4
| style="text-align:center;"|3:00
|
|-
| colspan=9|Legend:

See also 
List of male kickboxers

References

External links
Official DYNAMITE Profile

1984 births
Living people
Romanian male kickboxers
Heavyweight kickboxers
Romanian sportsperson-politicians
Democratic Liberal Party (Romania) politicians
National Liberal Party (Romania) politicians
Councillors in Romania
People from Iași County
Dancing with the Stars winners
I'm a Celebrity...Get Me Out of Here! winners
Glory kickboxers
SUPERKOMBAT kickboxers
Romanian businesspeople
Romanian kickboxing promoters
Mixed martial arts executives
Romanian chief executives